Ambrose Christian Congreve CBE (14 April 1907 – 28 May 2011) was an Irish industrialist, best known for his world-famous garden at Mount Congreve.

Early life
He was the son of Major John Congreve and Lady Helena Ponsonby, the daughter of the 8th Earl of Bessborough. He was educated at Eton and Trinity College, Cambridge. Childhood visits to the Rothschild estate at Exbury inspired a lifelong love of gardening.

Business career
In 1927, Congreve joined Unilever, working in England and in China. From 1939, he took over the running of Humphreys & Glasgow, the gasworks manufacturers and petrochemical engineers. Dr Arthur Glasgow, his father-in-law, was a co-founder of the firm.

He remained there until 1983, when the company was sold to an American concern. However, his abiding passion was gardening, especially at Mount Congreve, near Kilmeaden, County Waterford.

Mount Congreve house and gardens

The Mount Congreve estate lies just outside the village of Kilmeadan. It is famous the world over for its rare species of plants and also its plant nurseries. It consists of around seventy acres of intensively planted woodland garden and a four-acre walled garden. In addition there are an 18th-century house (the ancestral home of Ambrose Congreve), ranges of glasshouses, more than 16 miles of paths and a wholesale nursery. 

Congreve was dedicated to maintaining the historic gardens at his family's estate. He won 13 Gold Medal awards at the Chelsea Garden Show in London for this garden. In 1987 he was awarded a Veitch Memorial Medal by the Royal Horticultural Society, and in 2001 a Gold Medal (for a Great Garden of the World) by the Botanic Gardens in Boston, Massachusetts.

After Congreve's death, aged 104 years, the Mount Congreve estate was left to the Irish State.

Personal life
He married Margaret Glasgow in 1935. The couple divided their time between two homes, Mount Congreve in Ireland and Winkfield Manor in Berkshire, England. He was appointed CBE in 1965.

References 

 Kidd, Charles, Williamson, David (editors). Debrett's Peerage and Baronetage (1990 edition). New York: St Martin's Press, 1990.

1907 births
2011 deaths
People educated at Eton College
Alumni of Trinity College, Cambridge
Commanders of the Order of the British Empire
Irish centenarians
Irish businesspeople
Irish gardeners
Men centenarians
People from County Waterford